Paul William Azinger (born January 6, 1960) is an American professional golfer and TV golf  He won twelve times on the PGA Tour, including one major championship, the 1993 PGA Championship. He spent almost 300 weeks in the top-10 of the Official World Golf Ranking between 1988 and 1994.

Early years
Azinger was born in Holyoke, Massachusetts; his father Ralph (1930–2013) was a navigator in the U.S. Air Force and later a businessman. He started in golf at age five. After Ralph retired as a lieutenant colonel in 1972, he opened a marina, and Paul spent his summer pumping gas and painting boats.

The family moved to Sarasota, Florida, where he attended and graduated from Sarasota High School. Azinger attended Brevard Community College in the late 1970s. While there, he found more time to practice his swing, playing on the team as a walk-on, and landed a summer job at the Bay Hill Golf Academy in Orlando, which allowed him more practice time. Practice earned him more opportunity, in the form of a scholarship to Florida State University in Tallahassee, and he turned professional in 1981.

During his early years, Azinger collected meager earnings. He and his wife, Toni, bought a used motor home, a 1983 Vogue, and drove from tournament to tournament. Azinger had a breakout year in 1987, when he won three times on the PGA Tour and had a second place finish in the Open Championship.

Professional career

PGA Tour
Azinger won eleven tournaments on the PGA Tour in seven seasons from 1987 to 1993, climaxing in his one major title, the 1993 PGA Championship at Inverness, which he won in a sudden-death playoff against Greg Norman.

Azinger finished one shot behind Nick Faldo at the 1987 Open Championship at Muirfield after making bogey at both the 71st and 72nd holes. Azinger was bidding to become only the fourth golfer since 1945 to win the Open Championship at the first attempt and said that he was "heartbroken" to leave Muirfield without the Claret Jug trophy.

At the 1991 Ryder Cup, Azinger was involved in a controversial episode with Seve Ballesteros, with whom he had a fierce rivalry. Azinger and American teammate Chip Beck were using balls of different compressions off the tee on multiple holes, in violation of an agreement between the Cup captains. Azinger initially denied that the Americans had engaged in this practice, but admitted to it once he realized that there would be no penalty assessed.

In December 1993, Azinger was diagnosed with non-Hodgkin lymphoma in his right shoulder. His treatment included six months of chemotherapy and five weeks of radiation in California. He wrote a book called Zinger about his battle with the disease and was the recipient of GWAA Ben Hogan Award in 1995, given to the individual who has continued to be active in golf despite physical handicap or serious illness. In 2000, he won his first tournament in seven seasons at the Sony Open in Hawaii.

Azinger was the U.S. Ryder Cup captain for the 2008 at Valhalla Golf Club in Louisville, Kentucky. He led the team to its first victory over the European squad since 1999.  The team's victory was largely credited to his innovative strategy. This strategy is outlined in his book, Cracking the Code: The Winning Ryder Cup Strategy: Make it Work for You, which was released in May 2010. The book was co-authored with Ron Braund, a corporate team builder and psychologist, who consulted Azinger throughout the Ryder Cup.

Champions Tour
Azinger made his Champions Tour debut at The ACE Group Classic in February 2010. He played four events that year and none since.

Television work
Azinger first worked in television in 1995 while recovering from chemotherapy. Azinger was recruited by lead NBC analyst Johnny Miller to join the broadcast team as an on-course reporter, a stint which included reporting on the singles match at the 1995 Ryder Cup between Tom Lehman and Azinger's former Ryder Cup rival Seve Ballesteros, who was playing in his final Ryder Cup.

After returning to the PGA Tour for several more successful playing years, Azinger returned to broadcasting on a full-time basis.

From 2005 to 2015, Azinger worked as lead analyst for ESPN and ABC Sports' golf coverage. He initially shared analyst duties with his former Ryder Cup and Open Championship rival Nick Faldo.  Azinger and Faldo, along with host Mike Tirico, formed a broadcast team that was met with positive critical acclaim.  Faldo left for rival CBS after the 2006 season; since then, Azinger worked alone with Tirico.  However, when Faldo and Azinger were opposing captains at the 2008 Ryder Cup, Azinger's colleague Andy North filled in for him.  Faldo and Azinger have also reunited as analysts on two occasions. The first reunion was at the 2007 Open Championship (for ABC) and the second was at the 2009 Presidents Cup (for the Golf Channel).

After ESPN/ABC lost its rights to both the U.S. Open and Open Championship to Fox and NBC, Azinger joined Fox Sports as its head golf analyst in 2016, replacing Greg Norman.

In October 2018, NBC Sports and Golf Channel named Azinger their lead golf analyst, succeeding the retiring Johnny Miller – who had originally helped give Azinger his start in broadcasting during his recovery from cancer in 1995. After Miller ended his NBC career at the 2019 Phoenix Open, Azinger became NBC’s lead analyst during the Southern Swing in March 2019.  He remained with Fox for the U.S. Open, U.S Women's Open, and U.S. Amateur for the 2019 season alongside his NBC duties, until those championships returned to NBC, where Azinger had also ended up at, in 2020.

Other interests
Azinger is an avid poker player and competed in the main event at both the 2006 World Series of Poker and the 2008 World Series of Poker. He is an avid foosball player, and often seeks places to play foosball while traveling.

Azinger threw out the ceremonial first pitch at the Tampa Bay Rays' second ever playoff game on October 3, 2008.  He recently launched a new application for the iPad, iPhone, and iPod Touch called Golfplan.

Personal life
Azinger is a Christian. He and his wife Toni met at FSU and have been married since 1982. They have two daughters, Sarah Jean Collins and Josie Azinger Mark, and currently live in Bradenton, Florida.

Azinger gave the eulogy at the memorial service for his friend Payne Stewart, who was killed in a plane crash in 1999. His two managers and close friends, Robert Fraley and Van Ardan, also died in the crash.

Politically conservative, Azinger refused an invitation to the White House for the winning 1993 Ryder Cup team due to what he saw as draft dodging on the part of President Bill Clinton. He was however persuaded to attend and said that the visit "was just wonderful".

Professional wins (16)

PGA Tour wins (12)

*Note: The 1987 Panasonic Las Vegas Invitational was shortened to 72 holes due to weather.

PGA Tour playoff record (1–2)

European Tour wins (3)

European Tour playoff record (3–0)

Other wins (2)

Other playoff record (1–3)

Major championships

Wins (1)

Results timeline

CUT = missed the half way cut
WD = Withdrew
"T" indicates a tie for a place.

Summary

Most consecutive cuts made – 9 (1999 U.S. Open – 2001 PGA)
Longest streak of top-10s – 2 (1989 U.S. Open – 1989 Open Championship)

Results in The Players Championship

CUT = missed the halfway cut
"T" indicates a tie for a place

Results in World Golf Championships

1Cancelled due to 9/11

QF, R16, R32, R64 = Round in which player lost in match play
"T" = Tied
NT = No tournament

U.S. national team appearances
Ryder Cup:
 Player: 1989 (tie), 1991 (winners), 1993 (winners), 2002
 Captain: 2008 (winners)
World Cup: 1989
Presidents Cup: 2000 (winners)
UBS Warburg Cup: 2002 (winners)
Wendy's 3-Tour Challenge (representing PGA Tour): 1993, 1994 (winners)

See also
Fall 1981 PGA Tour Qualifying School graduates
1983 PGA Tour Qualifying School graduates
1984 PGA Tour Qualifying School graduates
List of Florida State Seminoles men's golfers
List of men's major championships winning golfers

References

External links

American male golfers
Florida State Seminoles men's golfers
PGA Tour golfers
PGA Tour Champions golfers
Winners of men's major golf championships
Ryder Cup competitors for the United States
Golf writers and broadcasters
Golfers from Massachusetts
Golfers from Florida
Eastern Florida State College people
Sportspeople from Holyoke, Massachusetts
Sportspeople from Sarasota, Florida
Sarasota High School alumni
1960 births
Living people